Hargrave Hill is a hill at the south side of Wright Ice Piedmont,  northeast of the mouth of Henson Glacier, in Graham Land, Antarctica. It was mapped from air photos taken by Hunting Aerosurveys Ltd (1955–57), and was named by the UK Antarctic Place-Names Committee after Lawrence Hargrave, the Australian inventor of the box-kite and other fixed wing flying machines, and a pioneer of rotary aero engines (1884–1909).

References

Hills of Graham Land
Davis Coast